The Downfall is a 1961 Greek drama film made by Finos Films.  It was directed by Giannis Dalianidis and starring Zoi Laskari, Nikos Kourkoulos, Vangelis Voulgaridis and Pantelis Zervos.

The movie made 161,331 tickets first class cinemas in Athens and Piraeus.

Plot
A group of Greek youngster in the early 1960s, lead their lives ignoring their parents. Three of them are: Rea (Zoe Laskari), whose parents do not pay much attention to the carefree way of life she leads, Costas (Nikos Kourkoulos), Rea's boyfriend, who comes from a broken home and is secretly engaging in love affairs with other girls and Petros (Vangelis Voulgaridis), who is a kind and gentle person and is also in love with Rea. Their main concern is the same as most of the 1960s youngsters, i.e. going to parties where we can see the decadent way in which they have fun (passionate dancing, kissing, striptease etc.). A few days later, Rea learns about Costas' promiscuous life, dumps him and decides to have an affair with Petros. Costas, in order to get his revenge, arranges a meeting in a park where he abandons her naked. After humiliating her like that, he has an affair with her sister, Lena (Mirka Kalantzopoulou). Rea gets furious and wanting to protect her sister from that evil person, kills him. She is led to court, where her attorney is her own father, and after a very long trial, Lena reveals the true reason the crime took place, an action that helps Rea get a lighter sentence.

Cast
 Zoe Laskari .... Rea Nikolaou
 Nikos Kourkoulos .... Kostas Petrakis
 Vangelis Voulgaridis .... Petros Kyriazopoulos
 Pantelis Zervos .... Leonidas Nikolaou
 Kostas Voutsas .... Bisbiras
 Mirka Kalatzopoulou .... Lena Nikolaou
 Nitsa Marouda .... Maria Siaka
 Eleni Zafeirou .... Elizabeth Nikolaou
 Periklis Christoforidis .... Filippas Kyriazopoulos
 Angelos Mavropoulos .... judge
 Lavrentis Dianellos .... Sotiris Siakas

Trivia

 The film marked Zoe Laskari's debut in cinema.
 The role of protagonist was offered to Aliki Vougiouklaki but she turned it down due to the nude scenes.
 Zoe Laskari poses as a threat to Aliki Vougiouklaki's vast popularity.
 The film boosted Nikos Kourkoulos's Kostas Voutsas's and Vangelis Voulgaridis's popularity.
 The movie reached number one at the Greek box office that year.
 After the movie Zoe Laskari signed an exclusive contract with Finos Films her being paid every month.
 The movie was screened worldwide and was number one in the box-office in Mexico during the season 1962-63 and was played for 57 consecutive weeks in the cinemas of Mexico City.
 The movie was due to be shown at the 1961 Thessaloniki Film Festival, but Filopimin Finos withdrew it (along with two others) because he didn't agree with the festival schedule.
 The success of the movie led to more films dealing with the issues of the so-called "raging youth" and "teddy boys" (punks) to be produced in the Greek cinema.

See also
 List of Greek films

References

External links
 O Katiforos
 

1961 films
1961 drama films
1960s Greek-language films
Finos Film films
Greek drama films
Films directed by Giannis Dalianidis